Giorgi VI the Minor ( Giorgi VI Mtsire; died 1313), from the Bagrationi dynasty was the 19th King of Georgia in 1311–1313.

Son of King David VIII, he was appointed as King of Georgia (actually, only the eastern part of the country) by the Il-khan Öljeitü upon the death of his father in 1311. He reigned under the regency of his uncle Giorgi V and died underage in 1313.

Ancestry

References
Cyrille Toumanoff, Les dynasties de la Caucasie chrétienne de l'Antiquité jusqu'au XIXe siècle : Tables généalogiques et chronologiques, Rome, 1990, p. 138.

Kings of Georgia
1313 deaths
Monarchs who died as children
Medieval child monarchs
Eastern Orthodox monarchs
Year of birth unknown
Bagrationi dynasty of the Kingdom of Georgia